Ras-specific guanine nucleotide-releasing factor 2 is a protein that in humans is encoded by the RASGRF2 gene.

RAS (MIM 190020) GTPases cycle between an inactive GDP-bound state and an active GTP-bound state. Guanine-nucleotide exchange factors (GEFs), such as RASGRFs, stimulate the conversion of the GDP-bound form into the active form.[supplied by OMIM]

Variations in this gene has been shown to be linked to the propensity to binge drink by teenagers.

References

Further reading